The Plunderers may refer to:

The Plunderers (1948 film), an American film
The Plunderers (1960 film), an American film
The Plunderers (band), an Australian band
The Plunderers (novel), a 1970 novel by Norman A. Daniels

See also
Plunderer (disambiguation)